Zoi Dimitrakou (born May 25, 1987), is a Greek former professional basketball player who last played Greece women's national basketball team. She has represented national team in several Eurobasket Women and in 2010 FIBA World Championship for Women. In 2016, she played for Washington Mystics in the WNBA.

References

External links 
 Eurobasket.com profile

Living people
Greek women's basketball players
Olympiacos Women's Basketball players
Washington Mystics players
1987 births
Forwards (basketball)
Basketball players from Thessaloniki